The Middle States League was a minor league baseball league that operated in the Northeast United States in 1889. A total of 13 teams competed in the league, though several joined the original 8-team lineup after its April 28 start and several folded before its September 10 close. It was a racially integrated league that included two African American teams, the Cuban Giants and New York Gorhams.
The Harrisburg Ponies won the league pennant.

History
The Middle States League began play on April 28, 1889 and ended the season on September 10, 1889.

During the 1889 season there were many franchise changes. Norwalk entered the Middle States League on June 12 and disbanded July 3. Lancaster disbanded on June 15. Reading disbanded June 18. The Norristown team entered the Middle States League on June 20 and disbanded August 21.  Philadelphia disbanded June 25. Lancaster disbanded on August 20. Shenandoah entered the Middle States League on July 17 and disbanded on August 6. Lebanon entered the league on August 9. Wilmington entered the Middle States League on August 22 and disbanded on August 30. York disbanded on September 3.

Teams
Cuban Giants
Harrisburg Ponies
Hazleton Pugilists
Lancaster Dutch
Lebanon Dutch Grays
New York Gorhams
Norristown
Norwalk
Philadelphia Giants
Reading Actives
Shenandoah Hungarian Rioters
Trenton Cuban Giants
Wilmington Peach Growers
York Hayseeds

Standings & statistics
1889 Middle States Leagueschedule President: Charles P. Mason / William H. Voltz  
  Norwalk entered the league June 12 and disbanded July 3;  Lancaster disbanded June 15Reading disbanded June 18; Norristown entered the league June 20 and disbanded August 21 Philadelphia disbanded June 25; franchise based at Lancaster, PA; disbanded August 20 Shenandoah entered the league July 17 and disbanded August 6  Lebanon entered the league August 9; Wilmington entered the league August 22 and disbanded August 30 York disbanded September 3 The Cuban Giants played in Trenton and Hoboken. The New York Gorhams played in Hoboken and Easton.

References

External links
Stats Crew

Baseball leagues in Connecticut
Baseball leagues in Delaware
Baseball leagues in New Jersey
Baseball leagues in Pennsylvania
Defunct independent baseball leagues in the United States
Sports leagues established in 1889
Defunct minor baseball leagues in the United States
Sports leagues disestablished in 1889
1889 establishments in the United States
1889 disestablishments in the United States